{{DISPLAYTITLE:AqBurkitt}}

The AqBurkitt (also: Trismegistos nr: 62108, Taylor-Schechter 12.184 + Taylor-Schechter 20.50 = Taylor-Schlechter 2.89.326, vh074, t050, LDAB 3268) are fragments of a palimpsest containing a portion of the Books of Kings from Aquila's translation of the Hebrew bible from the 6th century, overwritten by some liturgical poems of Yanai dating from the 9–11th century. This  Aquila translation was performed approximately in the early or mid-second century C.E.

History 
A lot of manuscripts were found at Geniza, in the Ben Ezra Synagogue, Egypt and these palimpsest fragments were brought to Cambridge by Solomon Schechter. AqBurkitt was published by Francis Crawford Burkitt (this is where the name comes from) in Fragments of the Books of Kings According to the Translation of Aquila (1897). Burkitt concludes that the manuscript is indisputably Jewish because it comes from the Geniza, and because the Jews at the time of Justinian used the Aquila version. On the other hand, it has been argued that the scribe who copied it was a Christian.

Description 
There are preserved "separate pairs of conjugate vellum leaves" of the manuscript (bifolium).

Aquila's text 
Aquila's text is badly preserved. It has been written in two columns and 23 or 24 lines per page and contains parts of 1 Kings 20:7–17 and 2 Kings 23:11–27 (3 Kings xxi 7–17 and 4 Kings xxiii 11–27 according to Septuagint numbering). This palimpsest is written in koine Greek language, in bold uncial letters, without capital letters at beginnings or paragraphs or as the first letter of the pages. This is one of the few fragments that preserve part of the translation of Aquila, which has also been found in a few hexaplaric manuscripts.

Tetragrammaton and nomina sacra
The tetragrammaton is written in paleo-Hebrew script characters in following places: 1 Kings 20:13, 14; 2 Kings 23:12, 16, 21, 23, 25, 26, 27. The rendering of the letters yod and waw are generally identical and the sign used for it is a corruption of both letters. Criticizing the idea of Jewish origin of the manuscript because of the presence of the nomina sacra, Edmon L. Gallagher noted that none of Greek manuscripts considered Jewish use κύριος as divine name. He concludes that there is no certainty about whether it was a Jew or a Christian who transcribed the Cairo Genizah manuscripts of the Greek translation of the Hebrew Bible by Aquila.

Yannai's text 
The upper text is a liturgical work of Yannai written in Hebrew. This work contains Qerovot poems on four sedarim in Leviticus (13:29; 14:1; 21:1; 22:13), "which can be joined with other leaves in the Genizah to make a complete quire". The text was dated to 11th century C.E. by Schechter,  but it may be older, even to the ninth century.

Actual location 
This fragment is currently stored in the University of Cambridge Digital Library.

See also 
 AqTaylor
 Hexapla
 Papyrus Rylands 458 the oldest manuscripts
 Septuagint manuscripts

References

Sources and further reading

External links 
The Jewish Quarterly Review, Apr., 1899, Vol. 11, No. 3

4th-century biblical manuscripts
5th-century biblical manuscripts